Leo Esser (born February 17, 1907, date of death unknown) was a German diver who competed in the 1932 Summer Olympics and in the 1936 Summer Olympics. He was born in Düsseldorf. In 1932 he finished fifth in the 3 metre springboard event. Four years later he finished sixth in the 3 metre springboard competition.

References

1907 births
Year of death missing
German male divers
Olympic divers of Germany
Divers at the 1932 Summer Olympics
Divers at the 1936 Summer Olympics
Sportspeople from Düsseldorf
20th-century German people